M91 or M-91 may refer to:
 Various iterations of the Carcano, an Italian rifle
 M-91 (Michigan highway), a state highway in Michigan 
 M91 rocket launcher, a 115mm, 45-tube, trailer mount for the M55 rocket used by the United States Army and United States Marine Corps
 M91 (camouflage), a Finnish military camouflage pattern of the uniform of the year 1991
 McCarthy 91 function, a recursive function defined by the computer scientist John McCarthy as a test case for formal verification within computer science
 Messier 91, a barred spiral galaxy about 63 million light-years away in the constellation Coma Berenices
 Mosin Nagant Model 1891 Infantry Rifle, a Russian/Soviet rifle
 Psihološko propagandni komplet M-91, the third studio album released in 1991 by Montenegrin-Serbian musician Rambo Amadeus
 Zastava M91, a Serbian sniper rifle